Shiriihan Mohamed Abdulle (born 16 June 1991), known mononymously as Cherrie, is a Swedish singer of Somali descent. She has released three albums and mixtapes, collaborated with international artists such as Stormzy and Kehlani, and in 2019 a short film was released about her life and rise to stardom. Cherrie was raised in Lojo in Finland, where her parents fled from Somalia. At the age of 10 she and her brother, K27, moved to Rinkeby in Stockholm together with their mother.

Discography

Albums

Singles

Featured singles

Other charting songs

Awards

Sweden GAFFA Awards 

!ref.
|-
| 2019
| Herself
| Årets Soloartist
| 
|

Notes

References

Further reading

External links
 Official Facebook

Living people
1991 births
Musicians from Stockholm
Singers from Stockholm
Swedish pop singers
Swedish songwriters
21st-century Swedish singers
Swedish-language singers
Swedish soul singers
Swedish people of Somali descent
21st-century Swedish women singers